The 2013–14 Ontario Fury season was the first season of the Ontario Fury professional indoor soccer club. The Fury, a Pacific Division team in the Professional Arena Soccer League, played their home games in the Citizens Business Bank Arena in Ontario, California.

The team was led by general manager and head coach Bernie Lilavois with assistant coach Sam George, goalkeeper coach Jeff Tackett, and strength/conditioning coach Brent Billbe. The Ladies of Fury dance team was directed by Lynae de Leon.

Season summary
After a promising start with home wins over the Dallas Sidekicks and Sacramento Surge, the expansion Fury dropped six straight matches (including four on the road). They snapped the losing streak with a home win over Toros Mexico but lost two of the following three games. The Fury's sole road win came against the expansion Bay Area Rosal on January 11. Facing probable elimination from the post-season, key players were traded to other teams in advance of the PASL's February 1 playoff roster freeze. Ontario lost its final three games and finished the season with a 5–11 record.

The Ontario Fury participated in the 2013–14 United States Open Cup for Arena Soccer with a Wild Card Round victory over the San Diego Sockers Reserves of the Premier Arena Soccer League and ending with a Round of 32 loss to the San Diego Sockers.

Off-field moves
Team promotions included a Faith and Family Night on February 1.

Schedule

Pre-season

Regular season

† Game also counts for US Open Cup, as listed in chart below.

U.S. Open Cup for Arena Soccer

Personnel

Player roster
As of November 25, 2013

Other players that logged time on the field for the Fury this season include Jay Lee Harris (#2), Robert Tornel (#4), Heriberto Negrete (#9), Hugo Seisdedos (#12), Francisco Magana (#15), Bernie Lilavois (#26), Steven Ritchie (#98), Andru Camacho, Brent Gonzales, Jayro Martinez, Arturo Rodriguez, and Christian Vidaurrazaga.

Staff
The staff during this season include Bernie Lilavois as team president and head coach, plus Cynthia Lilavois as director of operations. Assistant coach Sam George, goalkeeper coach Jeff Tackett, strength/conditioning coach Brett Billbe, and director of game day operations Katelyn Eaton make up the game day staff. The team's head trainer is Santana Ruiz, equipment intern is Steven Lucero, and Bill Norris handles media relations. Director of soccer operations is Giovanni Gonzalez, community relations director is Lynae de Leon, and the game day host is Cole Volmer. The Ladies of Fury dance team is directed by Lynae de Leon. The team is headquartered at the Upland Sports Arena in Upland, California.

References

External links
Ontario Fury official website
Citizens Business Bank Arena official website
Ontario Fury at Inland Valley Daily Bulletin
Ontario Fury at Fontana Herald News

Ontario Fury
Ontario Fury
Ontario Fury 2013
Ontario Fury 2013